Griseldis (minor planet designation: 493 Griseldis) is a fairly dark main-belt asteroid 46 km in diameter.

Overview 
Griseldis is suspected of having been impacted by another asteroid in March 2015. Other asteroids suspected of an asteroid-on-asteroid impact include P/2010 A2 and 596 Scheila which also showed extended features (tails).

The asteroid was observed with the Subaru telescope (8m), the Magellan Telescopes (6.5), and also the University of Hawaii 2.2 m telescope in early 2015. The activity was detected on the Subaru in late March, and confirmed on the Magellan telescope a few days later (which is in Chile), but no activity was seen by April. Also, no activity was seen in archived images from 2010 or 2012 according to a University of Hawaii press release.

See also 
 354P/LINEAR
 596 Scheila
 P/2016 G1 (PanSTARRS)

References

External links
 
 

Background asteroids
Active asteroids
Griseldis
19020907
Griseldis
Small-asteroids collision
20150315